Alfred Pond (February 10, 1806July 29, 1887) was a Michigan politician.

Early life 
Pond was born in Clarence, New York on February 10, 1806. He moved to Michigan in 1839, where he settled near Flushing, Michigan in Clayton Township.

Career 
Pond served as clerk of Flushing Township, Michigan from 1840 to 1841. In March 1846, Clayton Township was officially organized, and Pond was elected as one of its first inspectors of elections. Pond would go on to serve in Clayton Township's local government. That same year, Pond served as the township's first supervisor, as well as a school inspector. Pond was re-elected as supervisor and as a school inspector in 1847. On January 4, 1847, Pond was sworn in as a member of the Michigan House of Representatives from the Genesee County district as a Democratic. He served until March 17, 1847. In 1848, John C. Clement served as supervisor, but when Clement resigned, Pond was appointed to fill his vacancy. In 1849, Pond served as school inspector again. In 1850, Pond served as justice of the peace. In 1851, Pond served as town clerk. Pond again served as justice of the peace in 1858. In 1859, Pond again served as supervisor. In 1860, Pond again served as school inspector, and would do so in 1862 as well. Pond served as justice of the peace in 1866 and 1870. Pond served as one of the founding vice presidents of the Genesee County Pioneer Association. In 1850, Pond served as one of the founding vice presidents of the Genesee County Agricultural Society.

Personal life 
Pond married Elvira Call in 1829.

Death 
Pond died on July 29, 1887 in Genesee County, Michigan. He is interred at Flushing City Cemetery.

References

1806 births
1887 deaths
American justices of the peace
Democratic Party members of the Michigan House of Representatives
Burials in Michigan
People from Genesee County, Michigan
People from Clarence, New York
19th-century American politicians
19th-century American judges